A total lunar eclipse took place on Saturday, September 16, 1978, the second of two total lunar eclipses in 1978. The Moon was plunged into darkness for 1 hour, 18 minutes and 39 seconds, in a deep total eclipse which saw the Moon 32.683% of its diameter inside the Earth's umbral shadow. The visual effect of this depends on the state of the Earth's atmosphere, but the Moon may have been stained a deep red colour. The partial eclipse lasted for 3 hours, 27 minutes and 11.6 seconds in total.

This is the 40th member of Lunar Saros 127. The previous event is the September 1960 lunar eclipse. The next event is the September 1996 lunar eclipse.

Visibility
It was completely visible in east in South America, Europe, Africa, Asia and Australia, seen rising over east in South America and setting over the Pacific (west of International Date Line), on September 17, 1978 local time.

Related lunar eclipses

Eclipses in 1978 
 A total lunar eclipse on Friday, 24 March 1978.
 A partial solar eclipse on Friday, 7 April 1978.
 A total lunar eclipse on Saturday, 16 September 1978.
 A partial solar eclipse on Monday, 2 October 1978.

Lunar year series

Tritos series

Half-Saros cycle
A lunar eclipse will be preceded and followed by solar eclipses by 9 years and 5.5 days (a half saros). This lunar eclipse is related to two annular solar eclipses of Solar Saros 134.

Saros series
Lunar saros series 127, repeating every 18 years and 11 days, has a total of 72 lunar eclipse events including 54 umbral lunar eclipses (38 partial lunar eclipses and 16 total lunar eclipses). Solar Saros 134 interleaves with this lunar saros with an event occurring every 9 years 5 days alternating between each saros series.

See also 
List of lunar eclipses
List of 20th-century lunar eclipses

Notes

External links 
 

1978-09
1978 in science
September 1978 events